Don't Take the Name of God in Vain is a 1999 Andorran short film directed by Josep Guirao. It is 32 minutes long and based on the novel The Branch (1984) by Mike Resnick.

Plot

The film is set in Andorra in the year 2046. A crime lord has arranged for a gathering of religious leaders, intended to answer a single question: How can one identify the true messiah? While they argue over the expected qualities of this savior figure, a man claiming to be the Son of God is revealed to be held at a nearby location.

Production

The film uses low lighting and simple props to create its atmosphere. It seems to have been an inexpensive production, similar to a one-act theatrical play.

Release
It was released in the US film festival circuit, including the Brooklyn Film Festival and the Miami International Film Festival.

References

External links

1999 thriller films
1999 science fiction films
1990s science fiction thriller films
Films set in 2046
Films set in Andorra
Andorran science fiction thriller films
1990s Spanish-language films
1999 short films
Religious science fiction films
Religious thriller films
Films based on American novels